Kalattur Narayana Swamy is an Indian politician who is a member of Andhra Pradesh Legislative Assembly. He represented the Gangadhara Nellore (SC) Assembly Constituency. He belongs to the YSR Congress Party.

In 2019, he became one of the five Deputy Chief Ministers of Andhra Pradesh in the Y. S. Jaganmohan Reddy led cabinet and was also given a charge of Minister of Excise and Commercial taxes.

References

People from Nellore
YSR Congress Party politicians
Members of the Andhra Pradesh Legislative Council
Living people
1949 births
Indian National Congress politicians
Andhra Pradesh MLAs 2019–2024
Deputy Chief Ministers of Andhra Pradesh